The Moraxellaceae are a family of Gammaproteobacteria, including a few pathogenic species. Others are harmless commensals of mammals and humans or occur in water or soil. The species are mesophilic or psychrotrophic (Psychrobacter).

Moraxella catarrhalis and Acinetobacter baumannii are human pathogens, and Moraxella bovis is the cause of "pinkeye" of cattle (infectious bovine keratoconjunctivitis).

References

External links
J.P. Euzéby: List of Prokaryotic names with Standing in Nomenclature
Pink-eye in Beef Cattle - Department of Primary Industries

 
Bacteria families